Jans Koster (born 1938) is a retired Dutch freestyle swimmer. She won a gold medal at the 1958 European Aquatics Championships (400 m) and set two European and two world records in 1500 m in 1956–1957. On 9 March 1960 she married Ben Hulsegge.

See also
 World record progression 1500 metres freestyle

References

1938 births
Living people
Dutch female freestyle swimmers
People from Naarden
European Aquatics Championships medalists in swimming
World record setters in swimming
Sportspeople from North Holland
20th-century Dutch women